Eidsvåg is a village in Molde Municipality in Møre og Romsdal county, Norway. The village is located at the end of the Langfjorden on the isthmus connecting the Romsdal peninsula to the Norwegian mainland. Nesset Church is located in this village. The village is home to some mechanical industries.

The Prestaksla Nature Reserve lies southwest of the village.

The village was the administrative centre of the old Nesset Municipality until its dissolution in 2020.

References

Villages in Møre og Romsdal
Molde